The Mark Lynton History Prize is an annual award in the amount of $10,000 given to a book "of history, on any subject, that best combines intellectual or scholarly distinction with felicity of expression". The prize is one of three awards given as part of the J. Anthony Lukas Book Prize administered by the Nieman Foundation for Journalism and by the Columbia University School of Journalism.

The prize is named in honor of Mark Lynton, a refugee from Nazi Germany, Second World War officer, and automobile industry executive. In 1939 Lynton was a Jewish German-born student, studying history at Cambridge when he and other German nationals were rounded up and interned in detention camps in England and Canada as enemy aliens, suspected of being Nazi sympathizers. When Lynton was released he joined the British Army, became a tank commander, and was later promoted to Major in the occupying force, Army of the Rhine, where he helped interrogate high-ranking Nazi officers. Lynton memorialized his odyssey in his memoir, Accidental Journey: A Cambridge Internee's Memoir of World War II. The prize was established by his wife, Marion, children, Lili and Michael, and grandchildren, Lucinda, Eloise Lynton and Maisie Lynton, to honor Lynton who was an avid reader of history. The Lynton family has underwritten the Lukas Prize Project since its inception in 1998.

Winners

See also

 List of history awards

References

External links
 Lukas Prize Project

American non-fiction literary awards
Awards established in 1999
History awards
Awards and prizes of Columbia University
1999 establishments in New York (state)
Columbia University Graduate School of Journalism